Episcapha is a genus of beetles belonging to the family Salpingidae.

The species of this genus are found in Southeastern Asia and Australia.

Species:
 Episcapha asahinai
 Episcapha flavofasciata

References

Salpingidae